"Pickin' Wildflowers" is a song co-written and recorded by American country music artist Keith Anderson. It was released in December 2004 as his debut single and the first from his debut album Three Chord Country and American Rock & Roll. It peaked at number 8 on the Hot Country Songs chart, number 64 on the Billboard Hot 100, and number 82 on the Pop 100. Anderson wrote the song with John Rich and Kim Williams.

Music video
The music video was directed by Eric Welch. It features Anderson singing the song in a crowded bar with a full band, as well as him trying to seduce a girl to go out with him...which they do, leading to sex in a car, in a smoky hallway, and on a truck bed. Back in the bar, other patrons are also seen dirty dancing, grouping each other and making out. It ends with a quick shot of the bar doorman's face (who is seen briefly in the video's opening welcoming patrons) giving a grimacing look to the camera.

Chart positions
"Pickin' Wildflowers" debuted at number 47 on the U.S. Billboard Hot Country Singles & Tracks for the week of December 25, 2004.

Year-end charts

References

2004 debut singles
2004 songs
Keith Anderson songs
Songs written by Keith Anderson
Songs written by John Rich
Songs written by Kim Williams (songwriter)
Arista Nashville singles